Åke Bertil Lundqvist (9 June 1936 – 4 August 2021) was a Swedish actor.

Lundqvist began his acting career in 1973, when he played a role as the bookkeeper Schröder in Selma Lagerlöf's Gösta Berlings saga.

Filmography
 2009 – Ångrarna
2008/2009 & 2012 - Häxan Surtant
 2001 – Röd jul
2000 - The Mind's Eye (novel)
Jakten på en mördare (1999)
Beck – Mannen med ikonerna (1997) (TV-film)
 1972 – Ture Sventon, privatdetektiv

References

External links

1936 births
2021 deaths
Swedish male film actors
People from Gävle
Litteris et Artibus recipients
Swedish male television actors
20th-century Swedish male actors
21st-century Swedish male actors